The Saga of the Light Isles is a historical fantasy duology by Juliet Marillier. The two books are:

 Wolfskin (2002) – A young Viking warrior, Eyvind, joins a voyage of discovery. In the Light Isles (Orkney) he encounters a Pictish priestess, Nessa, and experiences a clash of cultures and faiths. When his blood brother, Somerled, shows his true colours, Eyvind’s integrity is tested to the limit.
 Foxmask (2004) – A sequel to Wolfskin, but can be read alone. Thorvald sets out on a perilous quest to find the father he has never known. With his devoted friend Creidhe and fisherman Sam, he becomes embroiled in a mysterious conflict that will change him forever.

Fantasy novel series
Australian fantasy novels
Australian fantasy novel series
Pan Books books